In enzymology, a progesterone monooxygenase is an enzyme that catalyzes the chemical reaction

progesterone + AH2 + O2  testosterone acetate + A + H2O

The 3 substrates of this enzyme are progesterone, AH2, and O2, whereas its 3 products are testosterone acetate, A, and H2O.

This enzyme belongs to the family of oxidoreductases, specifically those acting on paired donors, with O2 as oxidant and incorporation or reduction of oxygen. The oxygen incorporated need not be derived from O miscellaneous. This enzyme is also called progesterone hydroxylase.

References 

 

EC 1.14.99
Enzymes of unknown structure